Wiesing is a municipality in the Schwaz district in the Austrian state of Tyrol.

Geography
Wiesing lies in the lower Inn valley north of the Inn at the entrance to the Ziller valley.

References

Cities and towns in Schwaz District